Leif Arne Brekke (born 12 March 1977) is a Norwegian football defender who most recently played for Modum FK.

He has played in the Norwegian Premier League for Tromsø IL. After joining IF Skarp in 2001, he played 200 matches in a row in the Second Division (third tier).

He grew up in Karasjok, and is the brother of fellow footballer Jan Egil Brekke. He has played for the Sápmi national football team.

References

1977 births
Living people
Norwegian footballers
Norwegian Sámi people
Tromsø IL players
Alta IF players
People from Karasjok
Norwegian Sámi sportspeople
Drøbak-Frogn IL players
Association football defenders
Sportspeople from Troms og Finnmark